Siganus fuscescens, the mottled spinefoot, black rabbitfish, black spinefoot, dusky rabbitfish, fuscous rabbitfish, happy moments, mi mi, pearl-spotted spinefoot, pin-spotted spinefoot, stinging bream or West Australian rabbitfish, is a species of marine ray-finned fish, a rabbitfish belonging to the family Siganidae. It is found in the Western Pacific Ocean.

Taxonomy
Siganus fuscescens was first formally described in 1782 as Centrogaster fuscescens by the Dutch naturalist Martinus Houttuyn with the type locality given as Nagasaki. This taxon is largely sympatric with the white-spotted spinefoot (Siganus canaliculatus) and these taxa are also very similar in appearance. Molecular analyses in 2011 found that there were three separate lineages within S. canaliculatus and S. fuscescens, that these lineages interbred and that each lineage had specimens which referred to either taxon, this suggests that S. canaliculatus is a synonym of S. fuscescens. This is not the position taken by FishBase, although FishBase does note the two species are sometimes confused, or Catalog of Fishes, although they recognise Siganus margaritiferus as a valid species, found from the Andaman Islands to the Solomon Islands, north to Japan and south to Australia. Further molecular analyses have found that this may be a species complex and, while not resolving the potential synonymy of S. canaliculatus, these have suggested that there are cryptic species within S. fuscescens. The specific name fuscescens means “darkened”, thought to be a reference to the dark upperbody.

Description
Siganus fuscescens as a moderately slender, laterally compressed body, the standard length being 2.3 to 2.9 times its depth. The dorsal profile of the head is weakly to notably concave over the eyes with either a blunt or a pointed snout. The front nostril has a flap which becomes shorter as the fish grows and is reduced to a small peak in the oldest fishes. The dorsal fin has 13 spines and 10 soft rays while the anal fin has 7 spines and 9 soft rays. The front spine on the dorsal fin points forwards. The caudal fin is nearly emarginate in smaller individuals of less than  standard length becoming forked in larger fish. The overall colour of this rabbitfish is greenish-grey to brown fading to silvery on the lower body, with a large number of small light-bluish spots, a slender brown bar runs along the upper margin of the operculum, and they frequently have a dark patch under the start of the lateral line. When they are asleep or threatened the adults adopt a mottle pattern.

Distribution and habitat
Siganus fuscescens is found in the eastern Indian Ocean and the Western Pacific Ocean from the Andaman Sea east to Fiji and Samoa, north to Japan and south to Australia. In Australia its range extebnds from Busselton, Western Australia, around the tropical northern coast to the Nadgee River in southern New South Wales, it is found around Lord Howe Island in the Tasman Sea. There is a single record from the Mediterranean Sea, from Italy, but it is thought that this record probably refers to an individual transported by shipping. It is frequently encountered in large estuaries.

Biology
Siganus fuscescens is a schooling species and is a mostly diurnal fish. The juveniles have a diet dominated by filamentous algae while the adults prefer leafy algae and sea grass to feed on. When they arrive on coral reef flats the larvae aggregate in schools with a normal size of 200 individuals, but may hold as many as 5,000. When they have reached 3 months old, the number of fishes in a school declines to about 12. Prior to spawning this species forms aggregations of 30-60 individuals in raised areas of the inner reef flats and they spawn on the 4th or 5th day of a new moon. Spawning occurred near the edge of the reef. Each female laid around 300,000 eggs in a single spawning. Individuals will spawn in consecutive years and fish older than two year old may spawn more than once in a season>

Venom
Siganus fuscescens, like other rabbitfishes, has venomous spines in the dorsal and pelvic fins. In S. fuscescens the venom has been found to be similar to that found in stonefish.

Fisheries
Siganus fuscescens is caught using small seine nets, set nets, fish traps, and by spearfishing. Landed adults are sold as fresh fish, but juveniles are frequenty preserved as dried fish and sold in large quantities.

References

Siganidae
Fish described in 1782
Taxa named by Martinus Houttuyn